Jennifer Guidi (born 1972) is an American painter.

Early life and education 
Guidi was raised throughout Southern California, as her family moved between Manhattan Beach and Orange County prior to settling in Palm Desert. Although neither of her parents had a background in visual art, she showed an early interest and began taking art classes in a local storefront, deciding by her freshman year of high school that she wanted to attend art school.

Guidi enrolled at Boston University, where she received a formal education in painting and printmaking that privileged traditional techniques and representations of the human body. As a result, Guidi primarily painted portraits, both of herself and of friends. After receiving her BFA in 1994, Guidi earned an MFA from the School of the Art Institute of Chicago in 1998 and relocated to Los Angeles in 2001.

Career 
In 2005, she staged her first solo exhibition at ACME. in Los Angeles, where she presented eleven intimately-scaled oil paintings on linen that drew comparisons to the paintings of Sam Francis and Fairfield Porter. At this time, Guidi was making representational paintings of landscapes, plants, and insects.

During a 2012 trip to Marrakech, she became fascinated by the rich patterning of Moroccan rugs, specifically the intricate stitching found on their rarely seen verso sides. She then began to paint from photographs of these woven surfaces, ultimately producing a series of abstract oil and sand paintings titled Field Paintings, which debuted in a solo exhibition at LAXART in 2014.  Featuring rows of minuscule, tactile impressions, these paintings marked a shift from representation to abstraction, as well as the introduction of sand into Guidi's work.

In 2017, Guidi presented her first solo museum exhibition at the Villa Croce Museum of Contemporary Art in Genoa, Italy. The exhibition consisted of large-scale sand and acrylic paintings, which were painted in the seven colors of the light spectrum and occupied the frescoed interior walls of the neoclassical Italian villa.  Methodically-produced meditations on light and color, Guidi's most recent paintings feature mandala-like compositions and have been compared to the works of Agnes Martin, Georgia O'Keeffe, and the Light and Space artists.

Guidi's work can be found in the public collections of the Hammer Museum, Solomon R. Guggenheim Museum, Marciano Art Foundation, and the Rubell Family Collection.

Museum exhibitions 

 2017: “Visible Light / Luce Visible,” Museo d’Arte Contemporanea Villa Croce, Genoa, Italy

References 

1972 births
Living people
21st-century American painters
21st-century American women artists
American women painters
American people of Italian descent
Boston University College of Fine Arts alumni
School of the Art Institute of Chicago alumni